Oakwood can refer to rapid transit stations on two different systems:

 Oakwood tube station, a London Underground subway station
 Oakwood station (Toronto), a Toronto subway station in Toronto, Canada